Alexandra Cadanțu was the defending champion, but lost in the quarterfinals against Johanna Larsson, who won the title by beating Anna Tatishvili 6–3, 6–4 in the final.

Seeds

Draw

Finals

Top half

Bottom half

References 
Main Draw
Qualifying Draw

Torneo Internazionale Regione Piemonte - Singles
Torneo Internazionale Regione Piemonte